MAC-1 may refer to:

 Macrophage-1 antigen
 Integrin alpha M
 Macintosh